Tsvetelin Tonev (born 3 January 1992 in Plovdiv) is a Bulgarian footballer who currently plays as a midfielder for Spartak Plovdiv.

Career

Botev Plovdiv
Tonev is a youth player of Botev Plovdiv. On 22 August 2009, he made his first team debut against OFC Sliven 2000 on 22 August, coming on as an 80th-minute substitute in the 3–0 loss.

Levski Sofia
In 2011 Tonev joined Levski Sofia. He make him team debut against Lokomotiv Plovdiv on 06.05.12, coming on as an 85th-minute substitute in the 3–2 loss. He make his debut in Europa League as a substitute in 2nd match of Levski in 2nd qualification round.

On 11 January 2013 he was sent on loan to Botev Vratsa until rest of the season. Him loan ended after he broke a leg on match day.

Career statistics

Club

References

External links

Sportal.bg Profile

1992 births
Living people
Bulgarian footballers
Botev Plovdiv players
PFC Levski Sofia players
FC Hebar Pazardzhik players
FC Botev Vratsa players
FC Montana players
Derde Divisie players
First Professional Football League (Bulgaria) players
OJC Rosmalen players
Association football midfielders